The SCSI architectural model provides an abstract view of the way that SCSI devices communicate.  It is intended to show how the different SCSI standards are inter-related.  The main concepts and terminology of the SCSI architectural model are:

 Only the externally observable behavior is defined in SCSI standards.
 The relationship between SCSI devices is described by a client-server service-delivery model.  The client is called a SCSI initiator and the server is called a SCSI target.
 A SCSI domain consists of at least one SCSI device, at least one SCSI target and at least one SCSI initiator interconnected by a service delivery subsystem.
 A SCSI device has one or more SCSI ports, and a SCSI port may have an optional SCSI port identifier (SCSI ID or PID).
 A SCSI device can have an optional SCSI device name which must be unique within the SCSI domain in which the SCSI device has SCSI ports.  This is often called a World Wide Name. Note that the "world" may only consist of a very small number of SCSI devices.
 A SCSI target consists of one or more logical units (LUNs), which are identified by logical unit numbers.
 A LUN may have dependent LUNs embedded within it.  This can recur up to a maximum nesting depth of four addressable levels.
 There are three type of SCSI ports: initiator ports, target ports and target/initiator ports.  A SCSI device may contain any combination of initiator ports, target ports and target/initiator ports.
 SCSI distributed objects are considered to communicate in a three layer model:
 The highest level of abstraction is the SCSI Application Layer (SAL) where an initiator and a target are considered to communicate using SCSI commands sent via the SCSI application protocol.
 The SCSI Transport Protocol Layer (STPL) is where an initiator and a target are considered to communicate using a SCSI transport protocol.  Examples of SCSI transport protocols are Fibre Channel,  SSA, SAS, UAS, iSCSI and the SCSI Parallel Interface.
 The lowest level is the SCSI Interconnect Layer (SIL) where an initiator and a target are considered to communicate using an interconnect. It consists of the services, signaling mechanism and interconnect subsystem used for the physical transfer of data from an initiator to a target.
 A SCSI task is represented by an I_T_L_Q nexus.  This is where one Initiator Port talks to one Target Port, addressing one LUN and together they execute one task (identified by Q).

External links
 SCSI architectural model
 T10 Technical Committee – list of all SCSI standards

Architectural Model